Vancouver East is a federal electoral district in British Columbia, Canada, that has been represented in the House of Commons of Canada since 1935. It is currently represented by New Democratic Party MP Jenny Kwan.

The riding of Vancouver East is the poorest in Canada with a median individual income of $24,374 (2010).

Vancouver East is known as a New Democratic Party stronghold; the NDP and its Co-operative Commonwealth Federation predecessor have won all but two elections in the riding since its creation in 1933. Both losses (1974 and 1993) have come at the hands of Liberal candidates who failed to retain the seat at the next election. The Conservative Party and its right-leaning predecessors have always fared poorly in the riding, rarely garnering more than 20 percent of the vote.

In the 2006 federal election, the NDP won a higher percentage of the vote in Vancouver East than in any other riding in the country: 56.6%. In 2011 the NDP increased its majority win to 62.83%.

Geography
The district includes the City of Vancouver's Downtown Eastside, Mount Pleasant, Grandview–Woodland, and Hastings–Sunrise.

Federal riding associations

Riding associations are the local branches of the national political parties:

Demographics
Though Vancouver East is home to a predominantly impoverished underclass populace, it is also however, home to a prominent industrial and working-class riding. The district is well-known for hosting North America's largest Chinatown in addition to being one of the poorest areas in the Metro Vancouver District, known as the Downtown Eastside. 42% of the riding's inhabitants are immigrants and 22% are of Chinese ancestry. A high number, 63%, of residents are renters, compared to only 37% home owners. 24% of residents over age 25 have a university certificate or degree. Manufacturing, tourism, shipping, accommodation and food service industries are vital to the employment base in this riding. The average family income is over $61,000 CAD. The unemployment rate is about 7.7%.

The ethnically diverse area is home to many of the city's artists and socio-political activists. In recent years, the area has been negatively affected by an influx of hard drugs and the concomitant social consequences associated with their use.

The riding is the least religious in Canada, with 55.1% of the population not adhering to any religion.

History
The electoral district was created in 1933 from Vancouver South and Vancouver—Burrard ridings.

Vancouver East was one two electoral districts in British Columbia that saw no changes to its boundaries proposed following the 2012 federal electoral boundaries redistribution.

Members of Parliament

Current Member of Parliament
Its Member of Parliament (MP) is Jenny Kwan. She is a member of the New Democratic Party.

Election results

See also
 List of Canadian federal electoral districts
 Past Canadian electoral districts

References

Notes

External links
 Library of Parliament Riding Profile
 Expenditures – 2004
 Expenditures – 2000
 Expenditures – 1997
 Website of the Parliament of Canada

Politics of Vancouver
British Columbia federal electoral districts
Federal electoral districts in Greater Vancouver and the Fraser Valley